The flags of the Austrian states show two (or three) stripes in the main colours of the respective arms. These flags are the state flags and are shown with the coats of arms, although it is common for them to be shown without it. Without the coats of arms, some flags are very similar, such as those of Tyrol and Upper Austria (also nearly identical to the flag of Poland). Frequently, the flags are used in vertical variants with or without coat of arms. The coats of arms of the Austrian States are also shown.

See also 

 Flag of Austria
 Coat of arms of Austria

References 

Austria
Flags
 
 
Austria
Austria